Elmer William Harris (July 22, 1925 – October 16, 1956) was a U.S. Air Force fighter pilot and ace during the Korean War with the 25th Fighter-Interceptor Squadron, 51st Fighter-Interceptor Wing. He is credited with shooting down eight enemy aircraft.

His squadron mates included Iven C. "Kinch" Kincheloe Jr.

Victories
 First: 17:10 – April 22, 1952 near Sinuiju, Korea
"One YAK-9 type aircraft by strafing. Flying in the number two position in a flight of four F-86 aircraft, Major Harris' flight initiated a strafing attack on several semi-camouflaged YAK-9s on the runway at Sinuiju. Starting his strafing run from low altitude, Major Harris scored numerous strikes on one of the enemy aircraft. Major Harris' leader observed the YAK-9 burning fiercely."
 Second and third: April 26, 1952 Silver Star citation September 5, 1952.
"Major Harris distinguished himself by gallantry in action against an armed enemy of the United Nations as a Pilot. On that date, Major Harris was flying number three position in a flight of four F-86 type aircraft when the flight was attacked by a much larger force of enemy planes. The enemy's determined aggressiveness caused the flight to split into elements, and during a defensive maneuver, Major Harris' element was forced to break up. Immediately three of the enemy planes attacked the wingman and two attacked Major Harris. Disregarding his own precarious situation, Major Harris attacked the three MIGs, shooting one of them down and forcing the other two to break off. Then Major Harris switched his attention to his own attackers, but before he could gain the offensive, his wingman was again attacked by a flight of enemy planes. For a second time Major Harris completely disregarded personal safety to aid his wingman, and again he destroyed one of the enemy planes and forced the others to break off their attack. Through his high courage, aggressive airmanship, and outstanding devotion to duty in the face of direct enemy attack, Major Harris reflected great credit upon himself, the Far East Air Forces, and the United States Air Force."
 Fourth and fifth: 13:50 – May 4, 1952 near Sinuiju, Korea
"Two YAK-9 type aircraft by strafing. While flying number two position in a flight of four F-86 aircraft, Major Harris' flight initiated a strafing attack on twenty-four YAK-9s parked near the runway at Sinuiju. Skillfully executing a strafing run on the enemy aircraft, Major Harris scored hits on two YAK-9s parked in revetments on the west end of the runway. Upon completion of Major Harris' run, two of the enemy aircraft were observed smoking and burning fiercely."
 Sixth: 18:07 – May 28, 1952 near Pihyon, Korea
"One MIG-15 type aircraft in aerial combat. Flying number three position in a flight of four F-86 aircraft, Major Harris initiated an attack on one MIG-15 of a flight of four that had engaged his flight. Major Harris fired a long burst, scoring direct hits in the cockpit section of the MIG. The enemy aircraft was observed to crash in the vicinity of Pihyon."
 Seventh: 18:18 – May 28, 1952 near Okkang-dong, Korea
"One MIG-15 type aircraft in aerial combat. Flying number three position in a flight of four F-86 aircraft, Major Harris observed two MIG-15s initiating an attack on his wingman. Closing on one MIG, Major Harris opened fire, scoring hits on the left wing of the enemy aircraft. He fired three more short bursts which caused the MIG to burst into flames. The MIG snapped twice to the right violently. When last seen, it was in a dive, spinning and burning in the vicinity of Okkang-dong."
 Eighth: 18:00 – July 12, 1952 near Pihyon, Korea
"One MIG-15 type aircraft in aerial combat. Leading a flight of four F-86 aircraft, Major Harris spotted a flight of four enemy aircraft attacking a flight of four F-86s. Major Harris pulled in behind the MIG-15 and initiated his attack. He observed pieces falling from the burning enemy aircraft. The MIG-15 was last observed, out of control, over Pihyon."

References

External links
Story about exploits with Kincheloe @ CombatSim

1925 births
1956 deaths
American aviators
American Korean War flying aces
United States Air Force personnel of the Korean War
Recipients of the Silver Star
United States Air Force officers